Kumbhavurutty Waterfall is a famous waterfalls in South India situated near Aryankavu panchayath in Kollam district of Kerala near Tamil Nadu border. Located on the eastern area of Kollam District, Kumbhavurutty falls is one among the few crowd pulling waterfalls in Kerala. During peak times, the daily collection of this tourism spot will cross Rs. 1,50,000. It is about 6.5 km away from Achenkovil. This waterfall is a part of river Achankovil. Manalar Waterfall is another important waterfall near to this. The travelers can see wild animals also if lucky. Because the waterfall is very close to the thick Konni Forest area. Palaruvi Falls is another nearby attraction of this falls.

See also
 Palaruvi Falls
 Manalar Waterfalls
 Oliyarik Waterfalls

References

External links

Waterfalls of Kollam district
Pamba River

ml:കുംഭാവുരുട്ടി വെള്ളച്ചാട്ടം